Hugh Dale Wilson (born 1945) is a New Zealand botanist. He has written and illustrated a number of books about New Zealand plants, and manages Hinewai Reserve on Banks Peninsula.

Early life and education

Wilson was born in Timaru, and brought up in Christchurch by parents keen on the outdoors and camping; he attributes his love for birds to a family holiday to Stewart Island. He went to Elmwood District (later Normal) School, where he began drawing birds at an early age. Planting New Zealand native plants in his backyard to attract birds sparked his interest in botany. At St Andrews College he was Dux in 1962. He taught for Voluntary Service Overseas, the British scheme on which Volunteer Service Abroad was later to be based, in Sarawak on Borneo. After attending the University of Canterbury, he studied the botany of Stewart Island / Rakiura, and then the Aoraki / Mount Cook region, for several years. This was followed by a botanical survey of Banks Peninsula. He was awarded an honorary doctorate by Lincoln University in 2019.

Banks Peninsula PNAP
The Department of Lands and Survey had a programme, known as the Protected Natural Areas Programme (PNAP), of identifying and protecting examples of plant life, animals, ecosystems and landscape features that make New Zealand unique. The PNAP was established in 1983, and the country was divided into 268 ecological districts, grouped into 85 ecological regions. Banks Peninsula was one of those regions, with Port Hills, Herbert and Akaroa making up its three districts.

Wilson started fieldwork on Banks Peninsula and Kaitorete Spit in September 1983. He established a 1000-yard grid-point system and surveyed a 6 m x 6 m sample plot at each site. That way, 1331 plots were surveyed over a five-year period. While the work had been supported by the Koiata Botanical Trust, DOC realised that it was directly relevant to their aims, and asked Wilson to write the Banks Peninsula PNAP report. The report was the 21st in the series and published in 1992.

Hinewai Reserve
Hinewai Reserve is a private nature reserve on Banks Peninsula. It started off as a 109 ha block of farmland bought by the Maurice White Native Forest Trust in September 1987 and is now 1230 ha of gorse and regenerating native bush. Wilson identified the land as suitable for the trust's aims during his PNAP work. He has been managing the reserve since its purchase.

In popular culture

Wilson is featured in the film Earth Whisperers/Papatuanuku.

In 2010, Wilson was interviewed for the feature-length documentary film Queen of the Sun.

In 2019, Wilson was the subject for the short documentary film "Fools and Dreamers: Regenerating a Native Forest".

Selected bibliography 
The year of the hornbill : a volunteer’s service in Sarawak (1966)
Wildflowers of New Zealand (1974)
Vegetation of Mount Cook National Park, New Zealand (1976) 
Wild plants of Mount Cook National Park : field guide (1978, 1996).
Field guide : Stewart Island Plants (1982, 1994) 
Banks Peninsula Track : a guide to the route, natural features and human history (2008, 10th edition)
Banks ecological region : Port Hills, Herbert and Akaroa ecological districts (c1992)  
Small-leaved shrubs of New Zealand (1993) 
Naturalised vascular plants on Banks Peninsula (1999) 
Hinewai : the journal of a New Zealand naturalist (2002) 
Food for tūī on Banks Peninsula : a botanical assessment  (2007) 
Natural History of Banks Peninsula (2009) 
Plant Life on Banks Peninsula (2013)

Notes

References 

1945 births
Living people
20th-century New Zealand botanists
University of Canterbury alumni
People educated at St Andrew's College, Christchurch
New Zealand conservationists
21st-century New Zealand botanists